Dmytro Horiha (born 8 October 1997) is a Ukrainian handball player for HC Motor Zaporizhia and the Ukrainian national team.

He represented Ukraine at the 2020 European Men's Handball Championship.

References

1997 births
Living people
Ukrainian male handball players
People from Brovary
Expatriate handball players in Poland
Ukrainian expatriate sportspeople in Poland
HC Motor Zaporizhia players
Sportspeople from Kyiv Oblast
21st-century Ukrainian people